Colin Murphy (born 19 March 1991) is a New Zealand footballer who last played for Long Island Rough Riders in the Premier Development League.

Career

Youth & College
Murphy played four years of college soccer at Boston College between 2009 and 2012. He was a team captain his junior and senior years. A graduate of the  Northfield Mount Hermon School, he was team captain and all New England there his senior year.

Murphy played for USL PDL club Worcester Hydra in 2012.

Professional
Murphy signed his first professional contract with NASL on 4 April 2014.

References

External links
 

1991 births
Living people
Boston College Eagles men's soccer players
New Zealand association footballers
Team Wellington players
Worcester Hydra players
Fort Lauderdale Strikers players
Long Island Rough Riders players
North American Soccer League players
USL League Two players
Association footballers from Auckland
Association football midfielders